(in Irish; also spelled , ,  or , and pronounced  in Old Irish) or  (in Welsh, pronounced ) was a board game popular among the ancient Celts. Fidchell was played between two people who moved an equal number of pieces across a board; the board shared its name with the game played upon it.

Etymology 
The name of the game in multiple Celtic languages -- Old Irish fidchell, Middle Welsh gỽydbỽyỻ, Breton guidpoill~gwezboell, Cornish gwydhbol -- is a compound translating to "wood-intelligence" or "wood-sense". The fact that the compound is identical in both languages suggests that it is of extreme antiquity, with the unattested earlier form being reconstructed *widu-kweillā "wood-understanding" in Common Celtic. The game is often compared to or identified with chess, though this is evidently erroneous, as chess was unknown in Europe until the 12th century. The Old Irish form evolved into , the word used in modern Irish for modern chess, along with Scottish Gaelic fidhcheall and Manx feeal; the similar  is the name in Welsh for modern chess.

History
It is clear that it was played on a board with opposing sets of pieces in equal numbers. Evidence suggests that it may instead have been derived earlier from the Roman game ludus latrunculorum ("game of highwaymen"), which is known to have spread into Germanic and Celtic lands by the early first millennium and is also known from post-Roman Britain. Fidchell shared with latrunculi the method of custodial capture, two around one enemy man on the same line. Archaeological finds such as the Stanway game discovered near Colchester with 13 pieces per side may also represent a British Celtic board game similar or identical to fidchell/gwyddbwyll.  

Some details of the gameplay can be deduced from literary mentions in early Irish literature. One text reads:  Leth a fóirni d'ór buidi, in leth aili d'findruinesuggesting that  was played by equal forces. The method of custodial capture with two men around one enemy on the same line is also explained in the Middle Irish tale of Mac da Cherda and Cummaine Foda, where a cleric plays fidchell all day, refusing to take his opponent's pieces or allow his own to be taken:"Maith", or Guaire, "imrem fithchill." "Cinda gontar ind fir?", or Cummaine. "Ni anse, dias dub dam-sa im óinfer find duid-seo forsin n-óintí oc imchosnam na saigti thall." "Mo cubais, immorro," or Cummaine, ni cumgaim-se anaill; acht ni gonab-sa ni gonfa-so mo moindter-sa." Laa chaidcht do Guaire oca thetarracht ⁊ ni ruba fer dia muinter. "Segonda sein, a clerich," or Guaire.

"Good," says Guaire, "Let's play fidchell." "How are the men slain?" says Cummaine. "Not hard, a black pair of mine about one white man of yours on the same line, disputing the approach on the far side(?)" "My conscience, indeed!" said Cummaine, "I cannot do the other thing(?), but I shall not slay (your men), you will not slay my men." For a whole day Guaire was pursuing him and he could not slay one of his men. "That is champion-like, o cleric," said Guaire.Unlike latrunculi with its usual pebble-shaped counters, however, conical pieces may also have been innovated among the Insular Celts, as stone cones for gaming have been found in sites at Shetland, Scotland and Knowth, Ireland. This is also suggested by Irish legends such as the Echtra Nerai where fidchell pieces become lodged in a skull during a fight:Doneco Fergus seco la soduin ocus bentoi sethnu a chinn do Briccriu cona durn co lotur na cuicfir fichilli batar hind-dum Ferguso hi cenn m-Briccriunn, co m-bo buan d'olcc do.

"On that Fergus glanced aside and struck with his fist at Bricriu's head, so that the five men of fidchell that were in his hand went into Bricriu's head, and it was a lasting hurt to him."The legends describe  as a game played by royalty and by gods. A series of  games form an important episode in the story . 

Lavish, sometimes mystical  boards appear often in medieval Welsh literature. A magic  comparable to 's appears in the Arthurian romance Peredur son of Efrawg; a number of French versions of the Holy Grail story feature similar chessboards with self-moving pieces, following the Second Continuation of 's Perceval, the Story of the Grail, though in these only one side moves, while the hero plays the other.

According to H.J.R. Murray's A History of Chess, the ultimate fate of Fidchell is shown a margin note upon one 15th-century manuscript about the Second Battle of Magh Tuireadh between the Tuatha Dé Danann and the Fomorians in Irish mythology. In the gloss, it is disputed whether Fidchell ("chess") could have been invented during the Trojan War, as both wars were traditionally believed to have taken place at roughly the same time and the Irish mythology manuscript refers to the playing of fidchell. While it is no longer possible to know whether it was introduced into Gaelic Ireland by the Hiberno-Norse or the Normans, by the 15th-century "Fidchell" had come to mean Chess in the Irish language and the original rules of the game had been completely forgotten.

Confusion with tafl
In the board games literature, it has often been suggested that  is a variant of the Welsh game , itself descended from the Norse  games. These games, along with the Irish , are played on a grid, often seven squares by seven, with the king in the middle. The king has a number of defending pieces around it at the beginning of the game, and they are surrounded by twice as many attackers. The object is to make a clear path for the king to the edge of the board, while the attackers must attempt to surround, and thereby capture, the king. However,  variants are usually played with unequal numbers of pieces, the attackers being twice as numerous as the defenders.  by contrast was played with equal numbers on both sides and there is no indication of a king piece. 

An artefact found in Ballinderry, County Westmeath in 1932, known as the Ballinderry Game Board, has been suggested to represent fidchell. This is a wooden board with Celtic symbols on it, with a seven-by-seven grid, marked off by 49 holes.
This artefact may be a  variant, and perhaps even a  board; many commentators assume that it is the type of board upon which one would have played . Based on the assumption that the Ballinderry board represented fidchell, some recent tafl board reconstructions and apps have given the name of "fitchneal" to a particular 7x7 tafl arrangement (see image), which has extended the confusion.

Historical impact
, as described in the legends, often has a mystical or divinatory aspect to it. This supernatural aspect is not as clearly reflected in the  games. 

There is clear archaeological and textual evidence that a  variant was played in Ireland in ancient times; however, this is more likely to have been the game of brandub, which had a king piece. Fidchell was played with equal forces, and so was not a form of tafl.

See also 
  games
 Druid of Colchester

References

Bibliography

External links

Rules and boards
 

  — a very clear set of Fitchneal rules.

 

  — suggested by some scholars to be a Fidchell game.

  — information about Fitchneal and other ancient Irish games.

  — includes a Fitchneal game, although it uses a different board layout

Computer versions
  — a Macromedia Shockwave version

  — a Fitchneal widget for the Mac OS‑X dashboard

Abstract strategy games
Ancient Ireland
Irish mythology
Welsh mythology

br:Gwezboell
cy:Gwyddbwyll#Gwyddbwyll Geltaidd